W. Michael "Mike" Dick is a Scottish curler.

At the national level, he is a two-time Scottish men's champion curler (1981, 1982).

Teams

Men's

Mixed

References

External links

Living people
Scottish male curlers
Scottish curling champions
Year of birth missing (living people)
Place of birth missing (living people)